Georgios Nikoltsis (born 6 April 1992) is a Greek professional footballer who plays as a striker for Aris Soudas.

Honours

AEK Athens
Greek Cup: 2010–11

References

External links

Myplayer.gr Profile

1992 births
Living people
Greek footballers
Association football forwards
Super League Greece players
AEK Athens F.C. players
Fokikos A.C. players
A.O. Glyfada players
Footballers from Naousa, Imathia